is a 1957 Japanese film directed by Teinosuke Kinugasa. It is set in Awa Province (Tokushima).

Plot 

From the pen of Eiji Yoshikawa comes this exciting story. The Naruto Strait separates Tokushima from the islands of Awaji and Honshu. On Tokushima the mad lord dreams of conquest and forges a bloody revolt against the Tokugawa shogunate. A mysterious swordsman named Noriyuki Gennojo has crossed Naruto's waters to uncover the Awa clan's secrets.

He puts his life on the line after finding a testament of Awa's secrets, written in blood by a dying man. Joining Noriyuki is a female ninja who loves him, and the beautiful daughter of an enemy who's sworn to kill him. Awa's defenders will stop at nothing to prevent the blood-soaked letter from reaching the shogun.

Cast 
 Kazuo Hasegawa
 Raizo Ichikawa
 Fujiko Yamamoto 
 Ryosuke Kagawa
 Saburo Date
 Osamu Takizawa

References

External links 
 http://www.raizofan.net/link4/movie2/naruto.htm 
 

Films directed by Teinosuke Kinugasa

1957 films
Daiei Film films
1950s Japanese films